Enric Ribelles Seró (1 February 1934 – 19 March 2014) was a Spanish footballer who played as a midfielder.

He amassed La Liga totals of 96 games and 16 goals over the course of eight seasons, with Barcelona and Valencia.

Football career
Born in Puigverd de Lleida, Lleida, Catalonia, Ribelles' professional career was solely associated to FC Barcelona and Valencia CF. He arrived at the former in 1956 from local UE Lleida, making his La Liga debut on 15 December of the following year in a 1–1 away draw against Real Zaragoza.

With Barça Ribelles, overshadowed in his position by László Kubala, played 78 games all competitions comprised and scored 20 goals, winning five major trophies including two national championships and as many Inter-Cities Fairs Cups. Subsequently he joined Valencia CF, where he remained a further four seasons and won another two Fairs Cups, notably netting in a 6–2 home routing of former team Barcelona in the 1961–62 edition (7–3 on aggregate).

Honours
Barcelona
Inter-Cities Fairs Cup: 1955–58, 1958–60
La Liga: 1958–59, 1959–60
Copa del Generalísimo: 1958–59

Valencia
Inter-Cities Fairs Cup: 1961–62, 1962–63

Death
Ribelles died in his hometown on 19 March 2014, at the age of 80.

References

External links
 
 Stats and bio at CiberChe 

1934 births
2014 deaths
People from Segrià
Sportspeople from the Province of Lleida
Spanish footballers
Footballers from Catalonia
Association football midfielders
La Liga players
Segunda División players
Tercera División players
UE Lleida players
FC Barcelona players
Valencia CF players
Spain B international footballers
CD Binéfar players
Catalonia international footballers